Francisco Agustín y Grande (1753–1800) was a Spanish painter of the Neoclassic style. He was born in Barcelona. He studied in Rome under Anton Raphael Mengs, and returned to become the director of a school of design in Cordoba. In 1799, he became a member for the Royal Academy of San Fernando in Madrid. He mainly produced devotional paintings for churches in Cordoba.

References

1753 births
1800 deaths
18th-century Spanish painters
18th-century Spanish male artists
Spanish male painters
Painters from Catalonia
Painters from Barcelona
Spanish neoclassical painters